Aban is the eighth month of the Solar Hijri calendar, the official calendar of Iran and Afghanistan. Aban has 30 days. It begins in October and ends in November by the Gregorian calendar. Aban corresponds to the tropical astrological month of Scorpio. 

Aban is the second month of autumn, and is followed by Azar.

The name is derived from Aban, i.e. "waters".

Events 
 13 - 1190 - 1811 Independence Movement of El Salvador, the first independence revolt in Central American lands, begins.
 19  - 1251 - Great Boston Fire of 1872
 24 - 1268 - Proclamation of the Republic (Brazil)
 14 - 1296 - Act of 5th November 
 16 - 1296 - October Revolution in Russia
 5 - 1297 - Czechoslovak declaration of independence: Czech politicians take over Prague from Austro-Hungarian government officials.
 7 - 1297 - Martin Declaration
 19 - 1297 - Armistice of 11 November 1918 officially marks the conclusion of the First World War, Józef Piłsudski forms first Polish independent government since the Partitions of Poland
 20 - 1321 - Naval Battle of Guadalcanal begins
 27 - 1357 - Jonestown mass suicide
 18 - 1368 - Fall of the Berlin Wall
 18 - 1384 - 2005 Amman bombings 
 14 - 1394 - Bento Rodrigues dam disaster
 20 - 1399 - 2020 Nagorno-Karabakh ceasefire agreement formally ends the 2020 Nagorno-Karabakh war
 18-20 - 1401 - Liberation of Kherson

Deaths 

 14 - 1392 - Habibollah Asgaroladi, senior Iranian politician.

Observances 
 United Nations Day - 2 or 3 Aban 
 United States Navy Day - 5 or 6 Aban
 Republic Day in Turkey - 6 or 7 Aban
 Cyrus the Great Day - 7 Aban
 Birthday of the Royal Marines and Czech Independence Day and anniversary of the foundation of Czechoslovakia - 6 or 7 Aban
 Halloween and Reformation Day - 9/10 Aban
 Abanegan - 9 Aban (Zoroastrian holiday)
 All Saints' Day - 9-10 Aban
 Guy Fawkes Night - 14-15 Aban
 October Revolution Day (former), Day of Military Honour on the anniversary of the 1941 October Revolution Parades (current) - 16 Aban
 Victory Day (Azerbaijan) - 17 Aban 
 Independence Day of Cambodia - 18/19 Aban 
 United States Marine Corps birthday - 19 or 20 Aban
 Remembrance Day (Commonwealth)/Veterans Day/National Independence Day (Poland) - 20 or 21 Aban
 Republic Proclamation Day of Brazil - 24 Aban 
 Proclamation Day of the Republic of Latvia - 26 or 27 Aban
 Entry of the Most Holy Theotokos into the Temple - 29/30 Aban
 Remembrance Sunday (Great Britain) - Third Sunday of Aban
 Volkstrauertag - Last Sunday of Aban

References 

Months of the Iranian calendar